Michael Haydn's Symphony No. 11 in B-flat major, Perger 9, Sherman 11, MH 82 and 184, was written in Salzburg in 1766. Hans Gál attributed this work to Joseph Haydn, but he was not the first to do so (Hoboken's catalog lists this as the second symphony in B-flat major so attributed). Movements of it were published as a Joseph Haydn work, in fact, in 1772.

Scored for 2 oboes, 2 bassoons, 2 horns, and strings, in four movements:

Allegro assai
Andantino, in F major
Minuet and Trio (trio in E-flat major)
Allegro molto

Discography

This symphony is included in a set of 20 symphonies on the CPO label with Bohdan Warchal conducting the Slovak Philharmonic. It has also been recorded by the London Mozart Players conducted by Matthias Bamert on the Chandos label and by the Orchestre de Chambre de Lausanne conducted by Christian Zacharias. It is also on Olympia OCD 404 where it is wrongly listed as P.52 (Symphony 14) in error.

References
 A. Delarte, "A Quick Overview Of The Instrumental Music Of Michael Haydn" Bob's Poetry Magazine November 2006: 18 - 19 PDF
 Charles H. Sherman and T. Donley Thomas, Johann Michael Haydn (1737 - 1806), a chronological thematic catalogue of his works. Stuyvesant, New York: Pendragon Press (1993)
 C. Sherman, "Johann Michael Haydn" in The Symphony: Salzburg, Part 2 London: Garland Publishing (1982): lxiv - lxv

Symphony 11
1766 compositions
Compositions in B-flat major